Robin Corbett, Baron Corbett of Castle Vale (22 December 1933 – 19 February 2012) was a British Labour Party politician and journalist.

Corbett sat in the House of Commons from 1974 to 1979 and then from 1983 to 2001, before being elevated to the House of Lords as a Life Peer.

Early life
Corbett was born at Fremantle, Western Australia, to Marguerite Adele (née Mainwaring) and Thomas William Corbett. His parents had recently immigrated to Australia from England. His father, a foundry worker and mechanical engineer, was a militant unionist, and his involvement in certain demonstrations resulted in he and his family being repatriated to England in 1935. They resettled in West Bromwich, and Corbett attended Holly Lodge Grammar School in Smethwick, leaving at the age of sixteen. He was called up for two years' national service in the Royal Air Force in 1951. After completing his national service he became a journalist, first for the Birmingham Evening Mail and then for the Daily Mirror. In 1968 he became deputy editor of Farmer's Weekly, then worked for IPC Magazines in 1970, where he stayed until his election to parliament in 1974.

Parliamentary career
Corbett first stood for Parliament at Hemel Hempstead in 1966, and then in a 1967 by-election at West Derbyshire, but was unsuccessful at both attempts.

He was elected Labour Member of Parliament (MP) for Hemel Hempstead at the October 1974 general election, but he lost the seat at the general election in 1979. He then returned to IPC Magazines, working as a communications consultant until he returned to parliament in the 1983 general election, representing Birmingham Erdington. He held this seat until retiring from the House of Commons at the 2001 general election, when Siôn Simon succeeded him as Labour Member of Parliament for Birmingham Erdington.

In the House of Commons, Corbett served as Opposition Spokesman for Home Affairs (1979–1992), then for National Heritage, Broadcasting and Press until 1995. He was a Labour Party Whip from 1984 until 1987, and Chairman of the Home Affairs Select Committee from 1999 to 2001. His Private Member’s Bill, still law today, granted lifetime anonymity for rape victims in court and media.

House of Lords
Created a Life Peer as Baron Corbett of Castle Vale, of Erdington in the County of West Midlands, on 5 July 2001, his political interests included Home Office, police, civil liberties, the motor industry, manufacturing, disability, children's rights, alternative energy, environment, agriculture, animal welfare, and the press and broadcasting. He was Chairman of the All Party Penal Affairs Group, a parliamentary organisation clerked by the Prison Reform Trust, and a Patron of the Forum on Prisoner Education and UNLOCK, The National Association of Ex-Offenders. He was chairman of the all-party British Parliamentary Committee for Iran Freedom and Chairman of Friends of Cyprus.

Lord Corbett was a Vice-President of the Debating Group.

Family
Married to Val Hudson in 1970, they had one daughter, Polly Hudson, a columnist for the Daily Mirror. Lord Corbett also had a daughter and a son from a previous marriage.

Death
Corbett died of lung cancer at his home in Hemel Hempstead on 19 February 2012, aged 78.

Robin Corbett Award
Following Lord Corbett's death in February 2012 and his lifelong interest in prisoners 'learning through doing', his family established a lasting memorial to his work in penal reform. The Robin Corbett Award for Prisoner Rehabilitation was launched in 2013 with the Prison Reform Trust as prisoner rehabilitation legacy.

The Robin Corbett Award funds £10,000 annually to three charities who do the most for prisoner reintegration. The presentation takes place at the House of Lords. Unless ex-offenders are steered in the right direction after release, around 50% will re-offend within two years – that figure plummets to 19% when they have a job. Yet only 12% of firms employ people with criminal convictions who have served their time and need to change direction. www.robincorbettaward.co.uk

3 This led to The Corbett Network, a coalition of over 90 decision-makers of charities, social enterprises and organisations involved in reintegration working together to persuade more firms to hire returning citizens. The videos we produced - view them on the website - has the same aim. www.thecorbettnetwork.com

On 11 February 2019 the Corbett Centre for Prisoner Reintegration opened in the centre of Nottingham, operated by the charity Safer Living Foundation. The centre aims to reducing reoffending by supporting ex-prisoners to reintegrate into society.

References

External links

1933 births
2012 deaths
Communications consultants
Deaths from cancer in England
Labour Party (UK) MPs for English constituencies
Corbett of Castle Vale
Politics of Dacorum
UK MPs 1974–1979
UK MPs 1983–1987
UK MPs 1987–1992
UK MPs 1992–1997
UK MPs 1997–2001
People from Hemel Hempstead
Australian emigrants to England
People from Fremantle
People from Smethwick
Royal Air Force airmen
Australian people of English descent
English journalists
People from West Bromwich
Australian emigrants to the United Kingdom
British consultants
Life peers created by Elizabeth II